The 1977 UNLV Rebels football team was an American football team that represented the University of Nevada, Las Vegas as an independent during the 1977 NCAA Division II football season. In their second year under head coach Tony Knap, the team compiled an 9–2 record.

Schedule

References

UNLV
UNLV Rebels football seasons
UNLV Rebels football